Mu Horologii (μ Horologii) is a solitary, yellow-white hued star in the southern constellation of Horologium. It is faintly visible to the naked eye with an apparent visual magnitude of 5.11. Based upon an annual parallax shift of 23.04 mas as seen from Earth, it is located about 141.6 light years from the Sun.

This is an evolving F-type star with a stellar classification of F0 III/IV, showing mixed traits of a subgiant and a giant star. It is around two billion years old with a projected rotational velocity of 79.2 km/s. The star has 1.5 times the mass of the Sun and is radiating 13 times the solar luminosity from its photosphere at an effective temperature of 6,898 K.

References

F-type subgiants
Horologium (constellation)
Horologii, Mu
Durchmusterung objects
019319
014240
0934